The Rural Municipality of Excelsior No. 166 is a rural municipality (RM) in the Canadian province of Saskatchewan within Census Division No. 7 and  Division No. 3.

History 
The RM of Waldeck No. 166 was originally incorporated as a rural municipality on December 13, 1909. Its name was changed to the RM of Excelsior No. 166 on March 1, 1916.

Geography

Communities and localities 
The following urban municipalities are surrounded by the RM.

Villages
Rush Lake
Waldeck

Resort villages
Beaver Flat

The following unincorporated communities are within the RM.

Localities
Main Centre
New Main Centre
Old Beaver Flat
Old Main Centre
Prairie View

Demographics 

Government 
The RM of Excelsior No. 166 is governed by an elected municipal council and an appointed administrator that meets on the second Wednesday of every month. The reeve of the RM is Harold Martens while its administrator is Dianne Hahn. The RM's office is located in Rush Lake.

Transportation 
Rail
C.P.R. West. -- serves Uren, Ernfold, Morse, Herbert, Rush Lake, Waldeck, Aikins, Swift Current

Roads
Highway 628—intersects with Highway 1
Highway 1—serves Waldeck, Rush Lake, and Herbert
Highway 812 -- Highway 1 serves Herbert

See also 
List of rural municipalities in Saskatchewan

References 

E